Garant is a surname. People with this last name include:

Alain Garant (born 1952), Canadian politician
Kevin Garant (born 1963), American guitarist, composer, and sound designer.
Robert Ben Garant (born 1970), American actor, comedian, writer, director and producer.
Serge Garant (1929–1986), Canadian composer, conductor, academic, and radio host. 
Sylvie Garant (born 1957), French Canadian model